Percy Watson (25 June 1898 – 10 May 1965) was an Australian rules footballer who played with Essendon in the Victorian Football League (VFL).

Notes

External links 
		

1898 births
1965 deaths
Australian rules footballers from Victoria (Australia)
Essendon Football Club players